Mount Fridtjof Nansen is a high massive mountain which dominates the area between the heads of Strom and Axel Heiberg Glaciers, in the Queen Maud Mountains of Antarctica. Discovered by Roald Amundsen in 1911, and named by him for Fridtjof Nansen, polar explorer, who helped support Amundsen's expedition.

References

Amundsen Coast
Fridtjof Nansen
Mountains of the Ross Dependency
Queen Maud Mountains
Four-thousanders of Antarctica